The Little Vampire is a 2000 comedy horror film based on the children's book series of the same name by German writer Angela Sommer-Bodenburg, about a boy who tries to save a young vampire and his family from a ruthless vampire hunter. It was directed by Uli Edel and written by Karey Kirkpatrick and Larry Wilson. The film stars Jonathan Lipnicki, Rollo Weeks, Richard E. Grant, Jim Carter and Alice Krige.

Plot
9-year-old Tony Thompson moves with his family from California to Scotland, where they take up residence in a small castle while his father is employed building a golf course on the estate of Lord McAshton. In his new home Tony starts experiencing nightmares about vampires and a mysterious comet. Things are not any better for him at school, as he gets picked on by Lord McAshton's grandsons, Flint and Nigel.

One night, while dressed up as a vampire, Tony is mistaken for one by the young vampire Rudolph, who is on the run from the evil vampire hunter Rookery. After realizing that Tony is not a vampire, Rudolph tries to attack him but ultimately fails due to being weakened by Rookery. After trying to leave through flying out the window, Rudolph falls from the sky due to his weakness. Tony helps Rudolph find a cow to feed from, and in return Rudolph takes Tony flying. The two boys quickly become friends, and Rudolph confides to Tony that his family only drink animal blood and wish to become human. Rudolph reveals that they are searching for a magical amulet that can be used to turn vampires into humans, but Rookery is also seeking to use the amulet against them. When Rudolph takes Tony to the cemetery where his family lives, they are confronted by Rudolph's parents Frederick and Freda, Rudolph's romantic sister Anna and rebellious teen brother Gregory. Frederick doubts Tony's loyalty to his son, but when Tony helps repel an attack from Rookery, Frederick begrudgingly allows Tony to help them, but warns him not to betray him and the rest of the vampire clan to Rookery. Tony and Rudolph then proceed to get revenge on Flint and Nigel.

Rookery alerts Lord McAshton to the presence of vampires in the village. Lord McAshton reveals that his family has known about the existence of vampires for generations. Elizabeth, an ancestor of Lord McAshton, was romantically involved with Rudolph's uncle Von, who was the last known holder of the amulet, and both lovers were killed by the McAshtons. Learning this, Tony, Rudolph, and Anna seek out Elizabeth's tomb, where Tony experiences a vision pointing out the location of the amulet: Tony's own bedroom. Rudolph and Tony race Rookery to the amulet while the rest of Rudolph's family, along with Tony's parents, travel to the site of the ritual the vampires hope to perform. After a chase, Tony and Rudolph manage to escape with the amulet while Rookery inadvertently drives his truck over a cliff after getting entangled in a blimp.

Tony and Rudolph succeed in bringing Frederick the amulet, but the ceremony is interrupted by Rookery, who returns riding the blimp. The vampires are unable to stand against Rookery's glowing cross, but Tony's parents defend them and defeat Rookery, pushing him off a cliff to his apparent death. Tony completes the ceremony by wishing for the vampires to become human. Rudolph and his family disappear as the comet passes, leaving Tony and his parents alone and unsure if the ceremony succeeded. Some time later, while visiting the village market, Tony spots Rudolph and his family, now human, moving into a house in the village. At first they seem not to recognize Tony, but as Tony does the whistle to them their memories return, and the friends are reunited.

Cast

Production
Parts of the film were shot in farmland near Cockburnspath in Berwickshire in the Scottish Borders, at Culross and nearby Dunimarle Castle in Fife, in Newliston House, Dalmeny House and Dundas Castle near Edinburgh, at Gosford House in East Lothian and also on roads in West Lothian around Oatridge, near Broxburn. The school to which the main character goes is Low Port primary school in Linlithgow West Lothian.

Soundtrack

A soundtrack for the film, titled Music from and Inspired by The Little Vampire, was released on October 17, 2000, by New Line Records. Like the last soundtrack, Dutch Eurodance group Vengaboys released the song Shalala Lala as a single and it is included in the soundtrack album.

Track listing

Reception
The film was a box-office bomb, grossing $28 million against its $35 million budget.

Critical
The film received mixed reviews from 66 critics, with Rotten Tomatoes giving it a 55% rating. The consensus states, "The Little Vampire can't seem to find the right pitch, with its muddled, jumpy script and badly executed mix of cuteness and fright."

Lawrence Van Gelder of The New York Times gave it a positive review, declaring, "Not often does a family film come along that is literate, clever, mischievous and just plain fun." Roger Ebert, however, gave the film two stars, saying "The movie has first-rate credits, from the director Uli Edel (Last Exit to Brooklyn) to the writers Karey Kirkpatrick (James And The Giant Peach) and Larry Wilson (Beetlejuice), to the cast (Lipnicki played the kid in Jerry Maguire and Stuart Little). The costumes are neat, the photography is great--all the pieces are on hand, but they don't fit."

Michael Thomson for the BBC gave the film three stars, questioning the tone but remarking, "Yet the basic idea which drives this jolly film, along with Lipnicki's charm, is sometimes almost enough."
Jan Stuart for The Los Angeles Times praised most of the cast, but criticized Lipnicki, and said, "Older kids and grown-ups looking for more sophisticated humor will have to content themselves with a running gag about vampire cows, which could have been funnier than Edel makes it here."

See also
 Der kleine Vampir, the book series on which the TV series and the film are based
 The Little Vampire, a TV series also based on the same book series
 Young Dracula

References

External links
 
 
 

2000 films
2000 comedy horror films
2000 fantasy films
2000s children's comedy films
2000s children's fantasy films
2000s English-language films
2000s fantasy comedy films
American children's comedy films
American children's fantasy films
American comedy horror films
American fantasy comedy films
Children's horror films
Dutch children's films
Dutch comedy horror films
Dutch fantasy films
German children's films
German children's comedy films
German comedy horror films
German fantasy comedy films
Scottish films
English-language Dutch films
English-language German films
English-language Scottish films
Films based on children's books
Films based on German novels
Films directed by Uli Edel
Films set in castles
Films shot in Edinburgh
Films shot in East Lothian
Films shot in Fife
Films with screenplays by Karey Kirkpatrick
Films with screenplays by Larry Wilson (screenwriter)
Halloween adventure films
New Line Cinema films
Vampire comedy films
2000s American films
2000s German films